Françoise Vimeux is a French climatologist. She is Director of Scientific Research at the Institut de recherche pour le développement (IRD), works at the Laboratoire des sciences du climat et de l'environnement (LSCE) and at the Laboratoire HydroSciences Montpellier (HSM).

Biography

Education 
Françoise Vimeux graduated in 1999 with a Doctorate from the Université Paris 7 - Denis Diderot with an Very Honorable and the congratulations of the jury. Her thesis subject: Variations of the deuterium excess in Antarctica during the last 400,000 years: climatic implications Thesis director : Jean Jouzel. In 2011, she obtained a habilitation of research director at the Université de Versailles-Saint Quentin en Yvelines. Thesis presented: "Climate variability in the Tropics and Subtropics: contribution of stable isotopes of water".

Coordination of national and international projects 

 Glacial-interglacial changes in ocean surface conditions in the Southern Hemisphere by Valérie Masson-Delmotte, Jean Jouzel, Stievenart and Stievenard. M., Petit J.-R. and Vimeux F., Nature, 398, 410-413, 1999.
 Covariation of carbon dioxide and temperature from the Vostok ice core after deuterium excess correction, by Cuffey K.M. and Vimeux F., Nature, 412, 523–527, 2001.
 New insights into Southern Hemisphere temperature changes from Vostok ice cores using deuterium excess correction over the last 420,000 years, by Cuffey K.M., Jouzel J. and Vimeux F., Earth and Planetary Sciences Letters, 203, 829–843, 2002
 What are the climate controls on isotopic composition (δ D) of precipitation in Zongo Valley (Bolivia)? Implications for the Illimani ice core interpretation by Gallaire R., Bony S., Hoffmann G., Chiang. J. and Fuertes R. et Vimeux F., Earth and Planetary Sciences Letters, 240, 205–220, 2005.
 A promising location in Patagonia for paleoclimate and environmental reconstructions revealed by a shallow firn core from Monte San Valentin (Northern Patagonia Icefield, Chile) by de Angelis M., Ginot P., Magand O., Pouyaud B., Casassa G., Johnsen S., Falourd S. and Vimeux F., Journal of Geophysical Research, in press, doi:10.1029/2007JD009502, 2008.
 Past climate variability from the Last Glacial Maximum to the Holocene in South America and surrounding regions, Springer, 2009.
 Evaluation of cloudiness over Monte San Valentin (Northern Patagonia Icefield) from 2000 to 2008 using MODIS observations: implications for paleoclimate investigations from ice cores, par Maignan F., Reutenauer C. et Vimeux F., Journal of Glaciology, 57, 221–230, 2011
 A 1-year long δ18O record of water vapor in Niamey (Niger) reveals insightful atmospheric processes at different timescales, par Tremoy G., Mayaki S., Souley I., Cattani O., Risi C., Favreau G., Oï M. et Vimeux F., Geophysical Research Letters, 39, L08805, doi:10.1029/2012GL051298, 2012.

Scientific awards 

 2001: André Prud'homme Prize, Société Météorologique de France/Météo France
 2002 : Grand Prix Etienne Roth, CEA-Académie des Sciences with Valérie Masson-Delmotte.
 2006 : La Recherche collective prize, mention La Recherche (team : Daniel Brunsten, Delphine Grancher, Georg Hoffmann, Vincent Jomelli, Philippe Naveau and Françoise Vimeux).

Publications 

 Glacial-interglacial changes in ocean surface conditions in the Southern Hemisphere par Masson V., Jouzel J., Stievenard. M., Petit J.-R. et Vimeux F., Nature, 398, 410–413, 1999.
 Covariation of carbon dioxide and temperature from the Vostok ice core after deuterium excess correction, par Cuffey K.M. et Vimeux F., Nature, 412, 523–527, 2001.
 New insights into Southern Hemisphere temperature changes from Vostok ice cores using deuterium excess correction over the last 420,000 years, par Cuffey K.M., Jouzel J. et Vimeux F., Earth and Planetary Sciences Letters, 203, 829–843, 2002.
 What are the climate controls on isotopic composition (δ D) of precipitation in Zongo Valley (Bolivia) ? Implications for the Illimani ice core interpretation par Gallaire R., Bony S., Hoffmann G., Chiang. J. et Fuertes R. et Vimeux F., Earth and Planetary Sciences Letters, 240, 205–220, 2005.
 A promising location in Patagonia for paleoclimate and environmental reconstructions revealed by a shallow firn core from Monte San Valentin (Northern Patagonia Icefield, Chile) par de Angelis M., Ginot P., Magand O., Pouyaud B., Casassa G., Johnsen S., Falourd S. et Vimeux F., Journal of Geophysical Research, sous presse, doi:10.1029/2007JD009502, 2008.
 Past climate variability from the Last Glacial Maximum to the Holocene in South America and surrounding regions, Springer, 2009.
 Evaluation of cloudiness over Monte San Valentin (Northern Patagonia Icefield) from 2000 to 2008 using MODIS observations: implications for paleoclimate investigations from ice cores, par Maignan F., Reutenauer C. et Vimeux F., Journal of Glaciology, 57, 221–230, 2011
 A 1-year long δ18O record of water vapor in Niamey (Niger) reveals insightful atmospheric processes at different timescales, par Tremoy G., Mayaki S., Souley I., Cattani O., Risi C., Favreau G., Oï M. et Vimeux F., Geophysical Research Letters, 39, L08805, doi:10.1029/2012GL051298, 2012.

Actions for the general public 

 In 2018 Françoise Vimeux presents two videos entitled La mesure des isotopes stables de l'eau and Better understanding the atmospheric water cycle on Reunion Island on a famous streaming platform.
 Regular guest as an expert in climatology in the French television programme  C dans l'air programmes devoted to climate disruption.
 Intervention in the programme l'info s'éclaire broadcast on the French channel France Info.
 Speaker on the programme Vos questions d'actualités broadcast on the radio RFI.

See also 

 List of climate scientists

References

External links 
 Françoise Vimeux on the website of the Laboratoire des Sciences du Climat et de l'Environnement.
 Profession of faith on the website of the Institut de recherche pour le développement.
 Research expert sheet on the fmm.expertes.fr website.

French women scientists
Living people
French climatologists
Women climatologists
Climatology
20th-century French women
21st-century French women
Date of birth missing (living people)
Year of birth missing (living people)